The 2017 World Pool Masters, also known as World Pool Masters XXIV, was a nine-ball pool tournament that took place in Gibraltar between 17–19 February 2017. It was the 24th edition of the invitational tournament organised by Matchroom Sport.

The defending champion Shane Van Boening reached the second round, but was defeated by David Alcaide. Alcaide won the event, defeating Scotland's Jayson Shaw 8–7 in the final.

Tournament prize money

Tournament bracket

References

External links
 Official website
 World Pool Masters 2017 on AZBilliards.com

2017
World Pool Masters
World Pool Masters
World Pool Masters
World Pool Masters